Kenneth Douglas McCallum is a British intelligence officer who has been serving as the Director General of MI5 since 2020.

Early life and education
McCallum was born in Glasgow, Scotland in 1974. He attended a state school, after which he read mathematics at Glasgow University graduating with a first-class honours degree in 1996.

Professional life
McCallum has been an intelligence officer at MI5 for over two decades, including service focused on Northern Ireland-related terrorism, and leading counter terrorism investigations during the London 2012 Olympic Games. He was appointed Deputy Director General of MI5 in April 2017.

In 2018, McCallum took charge of the MI5 response to the attempted assassination of Sergei Skripal.

He succeeded Sir Andrew Parker as Director General of MI5 in April 2020.

In 2021, McCallum said in his annual threat update that the activities of China, Russia and other hostile states could have as large an impact on the public as terrorism, marking a significant shift in emphasis for the UK’s domestic spy agency. McCallum said that the British public will have to “build the same public awareness and resilience to state threats that we have done over the years on terrorism”.

At a joint press conference with Christopher A. Wray in July 2022, McCallum said that MI5 had "more than doubled" its effort against Chinese activity over the same timeframe, as part of an unprecedented joint warning with his counterpart at the FBI. He added the "most gamechanging challenge" MI5 faced came from an "increasingly authoritarian Chinese Communist party".

In November 2022, McCallum said there have been at least 10 potential threats by Iran to kidnap or kill British or UK-based people in 2022. McCallum also warned the UK "must be ready for Russian aggression for years to come".

References

Living people
Alumni of the University of Glasgow
Directors General of MI5
Civil servants from Glasgow
1974 births